The given name Antar is shared by:

Antarah ibn Shaddad, 6th-century pre-Islamic Arab warrior and poet known as Antar
Antar Boucherit (born 1983), Algerian footballer
Antar Singh Darbar (born 1955), Indian politician
Antar Djemaouni (born 1987), Algerian footballer
Antar Laniyan, Nigerian actor, film producer, and director
Antar Osmani (born 1960), Algerian footballer
Antar Yahia (born 1982), Algerian footballer
Antar Zerguelaïne (born 1985), Algerian runner